WRSA may refer to:

 WRSA (AM), a radio station (1420 AM) licensed to St. Albans, Vermont, United States
 WRSA-FM, a radio station (96.9 FM) licensed to Holly Pond, Alabama, United States
 WRSA (defunct), a daytime only radio station (1280 AM) in Saratoga Springs, New York